Robert Clarence Baltzell (August 15, 1879 – October 18, 1950) was a United States district judge of the United States District Court for the District of Indiana and the United States District Court for the Southern District of Indiana.

Education and career

Born in Lawrence County, Illinois, Baltzell attended Northern Illinois State Normal School (now Northern Illinois University) and then received a Bachelor of Laws from Marion Law School in 1904. He was in the United States Army Reserve as a Major from 1917 to 1919. He was in private practice in Princeton, Indiana from 1904 to 1920. He was a Judge of the Gibson County Circuit Court in Princeton from 1920 to 1925.

Federal judicial service

Baltzell was nominated by President Calvin Coolidge on January 2, 1925, to a seat on the United States District Court for the District of Indiana vacated by Judge Albert B. Anderson. He was confirmed by the United States Senate on January 13, 1925, and received his commission the same day. Baltzell was reassigned by operation of law to the United States District Court for the Southern District of Indiana on April 21, 1928, to a new seat authorized by 45 Stat. 437. He assumed senior status on January 19, 1950. His service terminated on October 18, 1950, due to his death.

References

Sources

External links
 Robert C. Baltzell collection, Rare Books and Manuscripts, Indiana State Library

1879 births
1950 deaths
Indiana state court judges
Judges of the United States District Court for the District of Indiana
Judges of the United States District Court for the Southern District of Indiana
United States district court judges appointed by Calvin Coolidge
20th-century American judges
United States Army officers